Bazil may refer to:

Given name:
Bazil Ashmawy, Irish radio and television personality who appears on Raidió Teilifís Éireann 
Bazil Assan, Romanian engineer and explorer
Bazil Broketail, 1992 fantasy novel by author Christopher Rowley
Bazil Broketail (novel) (1992) fantasy novel written by Christopher Rowley
Bazil Brush or Basil Brush, fictional anthropomorphic fox, appeared on daytime British children's television
Bazil Donovan of Blue Rodeo, Canadian pop and country rock band, formed in 1984 in Toronto, Ontario
Bazil Gordon emigrated from Scotland to America, settling in Falmouth, Virginia in 1786 where he opened a small store
Bazil McCourtey, fictional character from the British Channel 4 soap opera Hollyoaks, played by Shebah Ronay
Bazil Innocent Gohil, a Domainer and the owner of Loans.estate and more with great personalities.

Other uses
Bazil, demon of death in the folklore of Trinidad and Tobago

See also
Basil
Basile (disambiguation)
Baskil
Bazile (disambiguation)

cs:Bazil